Christine Traurig (born 13 March 1957) is an American equestrian. She was born in Nienburg, Lower Saxony, Germany.  She won a bronze medal in team  dressage at the 2000 Summer Olympics in Sydney, together with Robert Dover, Susan Blinks and Guenter Seidel.

References

External links

1957 births
Living people
People from Nienburg, Lower Saxony
American female equestrians
American dressage riders
Olympic bronze medalists for the United States in equestrian
Equestrians at the 2000 Summer Olympics
German emigrants to the United States
Medalists at the 2000 Summer Olympics
21st-century American women